The EDIC or Engin de débarquement d'infanterie et de chars are large landing craft that operate in the French Navy, Lebanese Navy, Senegalese Navy, and Madagascar Navy. EDICs have the typical landing craft utility design with a bow ramp and have a large aft superstructure compared to the derivative CDIC. The EDIC vessels were constructed in three groups, the first were launched in 1958, the second in 1967–1969 and the third in 1987. A sub class, called the Engin de débarquement ateliers or EDA was constructed between the first and second groups but were fitted out as repair craft. In French service, they predominantly were used in the French Pacific territories.

Design and description
The EDIC type landing craft were constructed in three batches and had differences between them. They were designed as tank landing craft for the French Navy. They could carry eleven trucks or five tracked landing vehicles. They mounted two  anti-aircraft (AA) guns. 

They landing craft have a complement of ten. They mount a Racal Decca 226 radar, two 20 mm modèle F2 guns for AA defence and two  machine guns.

Lebanese Navy
Two vessels in service with the Lebanese Navy are of EDIC III design. They can carry up to 96 troops and 11 lightweight fighting vehicles such as AML 90, Humvees or M113 armored personnel carrier. The vessels mount two Oerlikon 20 mm cannon, one  mortar, two 12.7 mm machine guns and one  machine gun.

EDA type
Four ships were constructed to similar dimensions and propulsion system to the first two EDIC groups in 1964–1965 and called the Engin de débarquement ateliers or EDA. Instead of being landing craft, they were equipped as repair and logistics ships for service on overseas stations. L 9084 was classified as an auxiliary electrical stores ship.

Ships in class

Construction and career
The EDIC I and IIs were constructed at various shipyards. Seven were built by Chantier Naval Franco-Belge, three by the Toulon Dockyard and two by La Perrière in France. The EDIC IIIs were built by SFCN at Villeneuve-la-Garenne, France. On 1 July 1974 L 9095 was transferred to Senegal and renamed La Falence. Most of the class was deployed to the French territories in the Pacific. In 1981, L 9082 was paid off. On 28 September 1985, L 9082 was sold to Madagascar and renamed Aina Vao Vao. The ship was repaired in 1996. L 9083 and L 9073 were stricken from the French Navy in 1986,  L 9091, L 9093, L 9096 in 1988, L 9094 in 1991 and L 9072 in 1993. Sabre and Dague were given their names on 29 April 1999.

On 7 November 1983, the Lebanese Navy loaned L 9096 from the French Navy and renamed the vessel Sour. The ship was later returned to the French Navy. That year, they ordered two EDIC III vessels from SFCN to be built in Villeneuve-la-Garenne, France. The two ships, named Sour and Damour, were commissioned into the Lebanese Navy on 28 March 1991. Both had been damaged in 1990 and repaired the following year.

See also

 Chaland de débarquement d'infanterie et de chars

Citations

References

 
 
 
 

Amphibious warfare vessel classes
Cold War amphibious warfare vessels of France
Ship classes of the French Navy